Bailando Por un Sueño: Segundo Campeonato Mundial de Baile (Dancing for a Dream:Second Dance World Championship) is a TV show, where celebrities and dancers from shows as Bailando por un Sueño, Dancing With the Stars, So You Think You Can Dance, etc. compete to obtain the Bicentenary Cup and to accomplish the dream of a Mexican family. It began on May 9, 2010 and finished on July 11, 2010, hosted by Yuri and Liza Echeverria. The show was aired at 19:00 (−6 GMT) on Sunday, by Canal de las Estrellas.

Format 

This show was based on the format of Bailando por un Sueño. Ten couples (formed by a celebrity and a professional dancer) competed each week against each other dancing several styles to impress a panel of judges. The judges gave to each performance a score from 1–10.

From the ten scores, there was a secret one, "The Secret Score" from one judge. It was revealed at the end of the show. Also, the highest and the lowest scores were cancelled, to eliminate favoritism.
 
At the end of each program, the lowest-scored couples were revealed. The next week, they confronted each other in a Dance-Off. Then, the judges voted to eliminate a couple. The couple with the highest number of votes from the judges were eliminated.

Jury 

There was a judge for each participating country

The Couples 

Luis Grijalva withdrew from the competition in Week 2 because of his disagreement with the producers and his partner Alessandra Rosaldo. His replacement is Luis David de los Ángeles

Charlie Bruce withdrew from the competition in Week 3 due to an injury in her leg. Her replacement is Lizzie Gough.

Alessandra Rosaldo withdrew from the competition on May 29, due to an injury in her head. Her replacement is Liz Vega.

Elena Grinenko withdrew from the competition in Week 5, due to pregnancy. Her replacement is Snejana Petrova.

The Dreams

Scores 

Red numbers indicate the lowest score for each week.
Green numbers indicate the highest score for each week.
 indicates the couple eliminated that week.
 indicates the bottom-two couples, who were in the Dance-Off for next week.
 indicates the returning couple that was in the Dance-Off, but wasn't eliminated that week.
 indicates the returning couple that was in the Dance-Off and wasn't eliminated that week, but was in the bottom two and in the Dance-Off for next week.
 indicates the couple that was in the Dance-Off for next week, but due to the withdrawal of other couple, there wasn't eliminated couples.
 indicates that the couple withdrew from the competition.
 indicates the winning couple.
 indicates the runner-up couple.
 indicates the third-place couple.

Due to exceed the number of permitted lifts, it was announced on May 27 that Argentina, Romania and Spain had broken the rules and were penalized with 8 points. Then Argentina and Rumania were tied with USA with 99 points, so the bottom-four were USA, United Kingdom, Argentina and Romania.

The second round of Week 5 consists of Jive and Cumbia Smackdowns. The contender pairs of couples were: France vs. Spain*, Argentina* vs. Peru, Mexico* vs. South Africa, and Romania vs. USA*. The winner of each Smackdown won 2 extra-points to their final score.

In Week 6, team South Africa withdrew from the competition due to disagreements with the production. So, there weren't elimination. Romania and Colombia teams were in a Dance-Off to decide which team deserved to return to the competition (the winner was Romania team). So, the couple with the lowest score (Peru) has to confront to Romania in a Dance-Off in Week 7 to decide who will stay in the competition.

In Week 9, due to an injury, Sevy Villete couldn't perform her first two dances (Paso Doble and Ballroom Rumba). Her replacement for these two dance was her choreographer Fauve Hautot, and the judges decided they haven't scored them. However, Sevy danced in the elimination Dance-Off.

Weekly Positions Chart

Dance-Off Chart 

 Due to South Africa's withdrawal, there was a special Dance-Off between Romania and Colombia to decide which team will return to the competition. The judges vote for the couple which deserve to return to the competition.

 The music for this Dance-Off was in charge of pianist Arthur Hanlon

Best and Worst Dances

Highest and lowest scoring performances 
The best and worst performances in each dance according to the judges' marks are as follows:

Dance Schedule 
The celebrities and professional partners danced these routines for each corresponding week.
 Week 1: Demonstration Dance
 Week 2: Disco
 Week 3: Tango & Merengue
 Week 4: Salsa & Freestyle Under the rain
 Week 5: Jive & Cumbia
 Week 6: Ballroom Cha-Cha & Cuban Mambo
 Week 7: Hip-Hop, Samba & Freestyle On the sand
 Week 8: Salsa en Línea, Quickstep & Reggaeton
 Week 9: Ballroom Rumba, Flamenco Rumba/Paso Doble, Tex Mex & Freestyle in The Turning Room
 Week 10: Dances chosen by each team: Waltz , Ballroom Cha-Cha , Quebradita  & Acrobatic Lyrical 

 Highest scoring dance
 Lowest scoring dance

This was a Dance-Off dance.

This was a special challenge: All the teams had to do a special choreography in an anti-gravitatory room, in a team or a solo. The winner awarded 9 estra-points added to their final score

These dances were unscored. The winner couple was chosen by the votes from the jury.

Music

Week 1 

Individual judges scores in the chart below (given in parentheses) are listed in this order from left to right: Wilmark Rizzo, Rossana Lignarolo, Jonaid Carrera, Rafael Amargo, Hugo Gómez, Latin Lover, Stuart Bishop, Carolina Vigil, Nick Kosovich and Bérénice Bel.

Running order

Week 2 

Individual judges scores in the chart below (given in parentheses) are listed in this order from left to right: Wilmark Rizzo, Rossana Lignarolo, Jonaid Carrera, Rafael Amargo, Hugo Gómez, Latin Lover, Stuart Bishop, Carolina Vigil, Nick Kosovich and Bérénice Bel.

The bold and italic numbers represent the highest and the lowest scores, which was cancelled from the final score.

Secret Score: Stuart Bishop.

Running order

Week 3 

Individual judges scores in the chart below (given in parentheses) are listed in this order from left to right: Wilmark Rizzo, Rossana Lignarolo, Jonaid Carrera, Rafael Amargo, Hugo Gómez, Latin Lover, Stuart Bishop, Carolina Vigil, Nick Kosovich and Bérénice Bel.

The bold and italic numbers represent the highest and the lowest scores, which was cancelled from the final score.

Secret Score: Latin Lover.

Running order

Week 4 

Individual judges scores in the chart below (given in parentheses) are listed in this order from left to right: Wilmark Rizo, Rossana Lignarolo, Jonaid Carrera, Rafael Amargo, Hugo Gómez, Latin Lover, Stuart Bishop, Carolina Vigil, Nick Kosovich and Bérénice Bel.

The bold and italic numbers represent the highest and the lowest scores, which was cancelled from the final score.

Secret Score: Wilmark Rizzo

Running order

Week 5 

Individual judges scores in the chart below (given in parentheses) are listed in this order from left to right: Wilmark Rizzo, Rossana Lignarolo, Jonaid Carrera, Rafael Amargo, Hugo Gómez, Latin Lover, Stuart Bishop, Carolina Vigil, Nick Kosovich and Bérénice Bel.

The bold and italic numbers represent the highest and the lowest scores, which was cancelled from the final score.

Secret Score: Bérénice Bel

Running order

Dance Off's

Week 6 

Individual judges scores in the chart below (given in parentheses) are listed in this order from left to right: Wilmark Rizzo, Rossana Lignarolo, Jonaid Carrera, Rafael Amargo, Hugo Gómez, Latin Lover, Stuart Bishop, Carolina Vigil, Nick Kosovich and Bérénice Bel.

The bold and italic numbers represent the highest and the lowest scores, which was cancelled from the final score.

Secret Score: Nick Kosovich

Running order

 Spain was penalized with 8 points due to exceed the number of permitted lifts (3)

Dance Off's 

 Peru & USA were tied with 58 points, so Rossana Lignarolo (Colombian Judge) had to choose the winner team, and she chose USA

Week 7 

Individual judges scores in the chart below (given in parentheses) are listed in this order from left to right: Wilmark Rizzo, Rossana Lignarolo, Jonaid Carrera, Rafael Amargo, Hugo Gómez, Latin Lover, Stuart Bishop, Carolina Vigil, Nick Kosovich and Bérénice Bel.

The bold and italic numbers represent the highest and the lowest scores, which was cancelled from the final score.

/ means the judge of each country can't vote for him/her own country

Secret Score: Rossana Lignarolo

Running order

Dance Off's

Week 8: Quarter-Finals 

Individual judges scores in the chart below (given in parentheses) are listed in this order from left to right: Wilmark Rizzo, Rossana Lignarolo, Jonaid Carrera, Rafael Amargo, Hugo Gómez, Latin Lover, Stuart Bishop, Carolina Vigil, Nick Kosovich and Bérénice Bel.

The bold and italic numbers represent the highest and the lowest scores, which was cancelled from the final score.

/ means the judge of each country can't vote for him/her own country

Secret Score: Hugo Gómez (first round) & Jonaid Carrera (second round)

Running order

Dance Off's

Week 9: Semi-Finals 

Individual judges scores in the chart below (given in parentheses) are listed in this order from left to right: Rossana Lignarolo, Jonaid Carrera, Wilmark Rizzo, Hugo Gómez, Latin Lover, Stuart Bishop, Carolina Vigil, Nick Kosovich and Bérénice Bel.

The bold and italic numbers represent the highest and the lowest scores, which was cancelled from the final score.

/ means the judge of each country can't vote for him/her own country. (Note: Due to Rafael Amargo's absence, the eliminated votes for Spain were from: Latin Lover (first round), Stuart Bishop (second round) and Nick Kosovich (third round)).

Secret Score: Carolina Vigil

Running order

Turning Room Challenge

Week 10: Finals 

Individual judges scores in the chart below (given in parentheses) are listed in this order from left to right: Rossana Lignarolo, Jonaid Carrera, Wilmark Rizzo, Hugo Gómez, Latin Lover, Stuart Bishop, Carolina Vigil, Nick Kosovich and Bérénice Bel.

The bold and italic numbers represent the highest and the lowest scores, which was cancelled from the final score.

/ means the judge of each country can't vote for him/her own country. (Note: Due to Rafael Amargo's absence, the eliminated votes for Spain were from Latin Lover).

Secret Score: Rossana Lignarolo

First round

Second round

Final Smackdown

Weekly Challenges

Michael Jackson Challenge 
In Week 5, four of the male contestants were in a Dance-Off, where they performed Michael Jackson's famous songs. The winner awarded a trip for all his team to a spa in Valle de Bravo.

Jennifer Lopez Little Train 
In Week 6, all the six female contestants were in a Dance-Off, where they performed a Jennifer Lopez's famous song. The winner awarded a trip for all her team to a spa in Valle de Bravo

Lis Vega, Delly Madrid and Sevy Villette obtained the same number of votes from the judges (3), so Nick Kosovich (American judge) had to choose the winner contestant. And he chose Sevy Villette

Ricky Martin Little Train 
In Week 7, six of the seven male contestants were in a Dance-Off, where they performed a Ricky Martin's famous song. The winners awarded an extra-point added to their final score.

Lady Gaga Little Train 
In Week 7, six of the seven female contestants were in a Dance-Off, where they performed a Lady Gaga's famous song. The winners awarded an extra-point added to their final score.

 Raquel Ortega & Valeria Archimo were tied with four points from the judges, so Bérénice Bel (French Judge) had to choose the winner contestant. And she chose Valeria Archimo

Dance Marathon 
In this challenge, each couple or each female contestant was paired with a male dancer, who isn't normally her partner in the championship. Then, each couple had to improvise the steps for the music that was being played. The winner couple awarded 2 extra-points (for each male/female dancer) added to their final score (in Week 9, the winner couple awarded 8 extra-points).

Week 8

Week 9

Yuri Challenge 
In Week 5, Yuri announced she's gonna dance against celebrities in several Dance-Offs. The winner couple of each Dance-Off had to dance again in a Final Smackdown, to compete to win $150,000.

Kids Challenge 
In Week 5, Yuri announced there will be a special competition for kids, to demonstrate how well they can dance. The competition was divided in two categories: Sub-15 (from 11 to 15 years old) and Sub-10 (from 7 to 10 years old). The winner in each category awarded $50,000.

References 
 
 

Mexican reality television series
Las Estrellas original programming